The table below lists the judgments of the Constitutional Court of South Africa delivered in 2014.

The members of the court at the start of 2014 were Chief Justice Mogoeng Mogoeng, Deputy Chief Justice Dikgang Moseneke, and judges Edwin Cameron, Johan Froneman, Chris Jafta, Sisi Khampepe, Mbuyiseli Madlanga, Bess Nkabinde, Thembile Skweyiya, Johann van der Westhuizen and Raymond Zondo. Justice Skweyiya retired in May.

References

 

2014
Constitutional Court